The Baptist Convention of Pennsylvania/South Jersey (BSCM), doing business as Baptist Resource Network of Pennsylvania/South Jersey, is a group of churches affiliated with the Southern Baptist Convention located in the U.S. state of Pennsylvania and New Jersey. Headquartered in Harrisburg, Pennsylvania, the convention is made up of around 315 churches as of 2020.

Affiliated Organizations 
Penn-Jersey Baptist - the state newspaper

References

External links
Baptist Resource Network of Pennsylvania/South Jersey

 

Protestantism in Pennsylvania
Baptist Christianity in New Jersey
Conventions associated with the Southern Baptist Convention